Brachemys is a genus of beetles belonging to the family Melyridae.

The species of this genus are found in Europe.

Species:
 Brachemys brevipennis (Laporte de Castelnau, 1838) 
 Brachemys demelti Evers, 1961

References

Melyridae
Cleroidea genera